Dreamworld Studios was an auditorium with production facilities located at the Dreamworld theme park on the Gold Coast, Australia. It is notable for being the location of Big Brother Australia’s live shows. In 2019, the studio, along with the Big Brother house, was bulldozed to make way for Steel Taipan.

History
Dreamworld Studios opened in 1986 as the Music Bowl. Around 1990, the auditorium's name was changed to Dreamworld Amphitheatre before being renamed Dreamworld Studios in 2001 when Big Brother Australia began production. In August 2019, the venue was demolished to make way for a future attraction for the theme park. In the months prior to its demise, vision of the abandoned house spread across social media. This resulted in numerous trespassers and vandals visiting the compound. Later, four children were charged with arson after they were seen running from the abandoned house at the time that a fire broke out.

Usage

Big Brother

Dreamworld Studios are mostly used during the production of Big Brother Australia. The Big Brother house was located a short walk away from the studios. This allowed live shows to take place in the auditorium. Big Brother was produced at Dreamworld from 2001 until 2008 for Network Ten and from 2012 until 2014 for the Nine Network.

Temporary use
During periods where Big Brother was not in production, Dreamworld Studios have been used for various temporary shows. 

In 2004, Dreamworld played host to the Believe in Dreams illusion show at Dreamworld Studios. The show starred John Taylor.

MTV Plugs Into Dreamworld (sometimes shortened to MTV Plugs In) was a temporary live show held in the Dreamworld Studios amphitheatre for the 2009—2010 summer school holidays. The show was run from 26 December 2009 to 22 January 2010. The 30 minute performance was shown 3 times a day and included a variety of music, dancing and stunts in a game show-like format.

Present day
Today, most of the site is now mostly used for storage. Part of the site is currently being used for construction of the new Steel Taipan roller coaster. The original Baldwin steam locomotive of the Dreamworld Express is currently stored there. All live shows are now held in Ocean Parade either at the Dreamworld Exhibition Centre or at the old Thunderbolt site.

References

Big Brother (Australian TV series)
Dreamworld (Australia)